Andrés Roemer Slomianski (born July 12, 1963) is a Mexican writer, producer and former ambassador to UNESCO.

Roemer rose to prominence by being at the front of Ciudad de las Ideas, organized in partnership with media, banking and retail conglomerate Grupo Salinas, an annual festival in the Mexican state of Puebla. as well as the creator of "Rethinking G20: Designing the Future" pre-G20 of 2012 G-20 Los Cabos summit in 2012, of the "Mex-I-Am" and co-funder of the "Haus der Musik", museum in Puebla City.

Andres Roemer is also author of sixteen books and two plays that treat diverse topics. His works are characterized for his analysis of non-market activities through economic analysis of law such as: happiness, art, sexuality, love, water, soccer, law, economics, crime, evolutionary psychology, government and public policy.

His name rose to prominence in public debate in the context of the Me Too movement, as several sexual abuse accusations were put forward by women who interacted with him throughout his career. As of 2021 Andrés Roemer has ceased his collaboration with UNESCO after several allegations regarding sexual misconduct, he is currently under investigation by the Mexican authorities.

Education 
Roemer is the grandson of orchestra conductor Ernesto Roemer and grew up in Mexico City.

He received various cultural awards prizes, and produced several television programs. completed two undergraduate degrees, a BA in economics at the Instituto Tecnológico Autónomo de México (ITAM) in Mexico City (1983 to 1987) graduating with honours (summa cum laude) and a Bachelor in Law from the National Autonomous University of Mexico (UNAM, 1983–1987) where he graduated with honours as well (summa cum laude). He did a master's degree in public administration (M.P.A-2) at Harvard University (1989 to 1991) where he earned the "Don K. Price" Award for Academic Distinction and Commitment within the Public Sector. Roemer also has a Ph.D. in public policy (1991 to 1994) from the Goldman School of Public Policy of University of California at Berkeley, where he earned the Academic Distinction for his thesis regarding water Public Policies and he was appointed Notorious Alumni of the Goldman School of Public Policy. He specialized on Cultural Policies, Law and Economics and Evolutionary Psychology.

Career

Academic positions 
Between 2011 and 2013, he was senior research fellow at the law school at the University of California, Berkeley.

From 1987 until 2000, Roemer worked as professor at the Instituto Tecnológico Autónomo de México (ITAM) teaching the courses "Law and Economics", "Economics of Culture and Art", "Microeconomics", "Public Policy," "Economics of Crime" and "Law and Economics." He also served as professor within the Master in Public Administration programme and taught courses such as "Public Policies" and "Economic Analysis of Law" at Centro de Investigación y Docencia Económicas (CIDE) 1997 to 1999.

Between 1992 and 1994, he was professor in the Master in Public Policy between Mexico and the United States at the Goldman School of Public Policy at the University of California, Berkeley. In 1990, he worked as assistant professor at John F. Kennedy School of Government and taught the course entitled "Leadership and Mobilization of Human Resources (Ronald A. Heifetz)" and the Theodore Panayotuo course on "Economics of Natural Resources". Additionally, he created and developed the course entitled "Press, Politics and Public Policy: The Latin American Case.”

Civil service and public appointments 
Roemer was Mexico's Ambassador to UNESCO based in Paris, France, ratified by Senate of Mexico on April 14, 2016. Regarding his time in this position, the website http://www.unwatch.org/ defines Roemer as a hero. By May 31 of same year he served as Consul General of Mexico in San Francisco, California, US, also ratified by the Standing Committee of Congress of the Union, July 31, 2013, and sent by the Federal Executive, Mr. Enrique Peña Nieto. From 2010 until 2013, he was a member of the advisory board of the National Human Rights Commission certified by the Senate of the Republic in 2010

From 2000 to 2003, he was Secretary Technician "B" (undersecretary) of Cultural Policy in the National Council for Culture and Arts. From 1998 to 1999 he worked as Technical Secretary of the Social Development Cabinet in the Office of former president Ernesto Zedillo and personal advisor in special topics for the New Federalism Project in Mexico from 1995 to 1997.  Also, between 1994 and 1995, Roemer worked as the coordinator of strategy of the Ministry of the Interior.

He was also advisor to the president Carlos Salinas de Gortari for his presidential campaign, within the area of Guillermo Raul Ruiz de Teresa. Between 1988 and 1990 he served in the National Nutrition Commission (Comisión Nacional de Nutrición) and from 1985 to 1988, served as head of the Department of Econometric Analysis at the Secretary of Fisheries, now known as Ministry of Environment and Natural Resources.

Roemer was removed as Mexico's ambassador to UNESCO following his refusal to cast the country's support of the Occupied Palestine Resolution. Until May 31, 2016, he served as general consul of Mexico in San Francisco, California.

Since 2007, Roemer is cofounder and honorary curator with Ricardo Salinas Pliego of the "Ciudad de las Ideas Brilliant Minds International Festival." He was the creator of "Rethinking G20: Designing the Future" pre-G20 of 2012 G-20 Los Cabos summit in 2012 and the "Mexiam" Cultural Festival in San Francisco, Cal in 2014 and cofunder of the Casa de la Música de Viena en Puebla From 2003 to 2015 he created and produced several television programs; in addition to being a writer and columnist in many journals and newspapers El Universal and La Crónica de Hoy.

From 1997 to 1998, he was principal for Latin America regarding public policy, business and leadership issues in Booz Allen Hamilton, Mexico City.

He was also the founding president of the executive commission of the Mexican Academy of Law and Economics (AMDE), the co-founder, member and chairman of the executive commission of the Latin American and Caribbean Association of Law and Economics (ALACDE), and member in the international area of the Mexican School of Lawyers, and president of the Alumni Association Fulbright-Garcia Robles. The San Francisco Chronicle called him a "rare public figure who deserves to be called a Renaissance man."

Main ideas 
Roemer has mainly focused his work on the economic analysis of the nonmarket forces, i.e. those goods or services that cannot be directly evaluated within the economy notwithstanding they significantly influence the economic system, such as feelings and emotions.  Furthermore, he coined the terms "demonocracy" e "ideasta." Demonocracy is the gradual deceit or manipulation of the legitimate leader of a democratic country over the decisions of the citizens to choose and vote, restricting their true freedom and individual rights; it is a failure of democracy:
[…] (demonocracy, is a term defining any individual or political group that appropriates the power in a legal manner, but in the exercise of its functions gradually eliminates freedom and the true right of citizens to vote).
The reform to Article 41 of the Mexican Constitution, Chavez in Venezuela, Correa in Ecuador and Morales in Bolivia, among others, teaches us that a democratic election does not guarantee democratic institutions. Even if the majority elects a government, this is not going to be a democratic one if it begins making legal amendments that would contain power at the expense of political rights and civil liberties.

The term ideasta refers to the person who formulates creative and revolutionary ideas about the world; the one who comes up with new ways of thinking in order to create more knowledge, novel paradigms, innovations and inventions in order to enhance the mind and open multiple horizons, allowing the growth and development of the individual and the world, because ideas:
[…] are the engine of the economies around the world. Innovation allow humans to produce more and better, think of an iPod, on Facebook, on skyscrapers, or on spaceships that allow us to go into space. All this technology originated from ideas that gradually boosted other ideas. When we bring exceptional people to talk about concepts or exceptional theories, we are forced to expand our horizons. It makes us aware of problems, solutions, projects, technologies or studies that we had no idea existed. This can inspire a train of thoughts that could lead to other innovative ideas. This is the exponential growth of ideas.

Rape and sexual harassment accusations
Andrés Roemer has been accused of rape and sexual harassment by at least sixty-one women, according to the organization Periodistas Unidas Mexicanas (PUM). Most of these women claim to have been harassed or raped with the same modus operandi: Mr. Roemer would meet with them at his home for job interviews, where the assaults would take place. Since 2019, some accusations had been made anonymously, but in February, 2021, Mexican dancer Itzel Schnaas decided to make her accusation public and several other accusers followed. In the aftermath of these events, Roemer moved to Israel to escape public scrutiny, where he was again accused of sexual misconduct.

Roemer has denied the abuse allegations of Ms. Schnaas through a publicly released video, but has not commented on accusations made by the other women. Roemer's weekly television show ″De cabeza con Andrés Roemer″ was inexplicably canceled on March 7, 2021, the eve of International Women's Day. Over the same weekend, Roemer's mansion in Colonia Roma was blocked off from the street with large wooden plates. On 5 May 2021, an arrest warrant for the felony of rape was issued by the Attorney General of Mexico.

Awards and recognitions 
Roemer has received numerous awards and recognitions on national and international levels:

 Winner of The annual 'Amir Aczel of Sciences and Humanities 2019' Prize awarded by the 'Amir D. Aczel' Foundation in May 2019 at The Harvard Club in San Francisco.
Given the Guardian of Truth and History Award by StandWithUs in October 2017 in Los Angeles, CA.
 Titled UNESCO Goodwill Ambassador for Social Change and the Free Flow of Knowledge in September 2017.
 Awarded the Eleanor Roosevelt Human Rights Award by United Nations Watch in September 2017.
 International Recognition for the Defense of Human Heritage and Human Rights awarded by the Simon Wiesenthal Center in June 2017.
 Recipient of the Sephardic International Leadership Award in New York City for his moral courage granted by The American Sephardi Federation.
 Grand Decoration of Honor, degree of Cross official, granted by the Austrian government for Services to the Republic of Austria.
 National Award for Journalistic Excellence of Club de Periodistas de Mexico by TV program "En el Ring" in the Debate and Critical Journalism category.
 The Elise and Walter A. Haas International Award 2013 of the University of California at Berkeley.
 Professional Achievement Award from the Alumni Association of ITAM in 2007.
 Microsoft Corporation created the Microsoft Award "Andrés Roemer" for Law and Economics Development for Distinguished Service to the Academic Community delivered since 2006 to date in 12 countries. 
 Awards and Fellowships at Harvard, Berkeley, Fulbright, Ford, CONACYT, SEP and ITAM within the period of 1985–1994.
 Banco Nacional de México Prize in Economics for his doctoral dissertation in Public Policy in 1994.

Associations 
Founding Member and Curator of the board of advisors of Poder Civico A.C. / La Ciudad de las Ideas since 2008.
 Member of the advisory board of Richard Dawkins Foundation for Reason and Science.
 Member of the honorary trustees of The Mexican Museum in San Francisco
 Member of the board of trustees of the Eduardo's Punset Foundation
 Member of the advisory board of the National Human Rights Commission certified by the Senate of the Republic from 2010 to 2013.
 Fellow of the Mexican Institute of Culture in 2007.
 Member of the European Association for Cultural Economics.
 President of the Fulbright-García Robles Alumni Association 2002 to 2005.
 President and co-founder of the executive commission of the Latin-American and Caribbean Law and Economics Association, ALACDE since 2003.
 President and founder of the executive committee of the Mexican Academy of Law and Economics, AMDE from 1994 to 2001.

Publications 
Roemer has conducted a series of PhD thesis, as well as a Negotiation Board Game, more than 1,000 television programs, has created more than 300 radio programs, has participated in more than 30 books and specialized journals and magazines. He has authored the following books:
Move UP with Clotaire Rapaille. UK: Allen Lane (Penguin Books), 2015. South Korea: Wiseberry, 2016.
 Oskar and Jack (Oskar y Jack). México: Editorial Miguel Ángel Porrúa, 2011.
 The Other Einstein (El Otro Einstein). México: Editorial Miguel Ángel Porrúa, 2008.
 Why Do We Love Football soccer? (¿Por qué amamos el fútbol?) (editor). México: Editorial Miguel Ángel Porrúa, 2008.
 No: An Imperative From Generation Next (No: Un Imperativo de la Generación Next). México: Editorial Aguilar, 2007.
 "What to do effectively combat terrorism?" (“¿Qué hacer para combatir eficazmente el terrorismo?”) in The Latin American and Caribbean Journal of Legal Studies, Vol. 1, Issue 1, Article 4, (2007), pp. 1–25.
 Terrorism and Organized Crime: An Economic and Legislation Focus (Terrorismo y Crimen Organizado: Un Enfoque de Derecho y Economía) (editor). México: Instituto de Investigaciones Jurídicas, UNAM, 2006.
 Between the Public and the Private: 1300 + 13 Questions to Think about Thinking (Entre lo Público y lo Privado 1300 + 13 Preguntas Para Pensar Sobre Pensar). México: Editorial Noriega, 2005.
 Happiness: A Law and Economics Focus (Felicidad: Un Enfoque de Derecho y Economía) (editor). México: Instituto de Investigaciones Jurídicas-UNAM, 2005.
 Enigmas and Paradigms: An Exploration between Art and Public Policy (Enigmas y Paradigmas: Una Exploración entre el Arte y la Política Pública). México: Limusa Editores-ITAM-UIA, 2003.
 "Philosophy of Law" ("Filosofía del Derecho") in Rodolfo Vázquez and José María Lujambio (Edits.). Contemporary Philosophy of Law in Mexico Testimonys and Perspectives (Filosofía del Derecho Contemporánea en México Testimonios y perspectivas). México: Distribuciones Fontamara, 2002.
 Crime Economics (Economía del Crimen). México: Limusa Editores, 2000. Roemer, A. (2000). (Likewise, there is a homonym playwright publication by Victor Hugo Rascon Banda [2007], based on Roemer's title).
 Law and Economics: Revising the Literature (Derecho y Economía: Una revisión de la Literatura) (editor). Prologue by Richard A. Posner. México: FCE- CED, 2000.
 Coauthored with Esteban Moctezuma Barragán A New Public Management in Mexico: Towards a Government That Produces Results The Political Economy of Latin America (Por un Gobierno con Resultados. El Servicio Civil de Carrera: Un Sistema Integral de Profesionalización, Evaluación y Desempeño de los Servidores Públicos en México) México: FCE, SMGE, CED, Academia Metropolitana, 1999. (Published in English by The London School of Economics-Ashgate Publishers).
 Sexuality, Law and Public Policy (Sexualidad, Derecho y Políticas Públicas). México: Editorial Porrúa-AMDE-ISSSTE, 1998.
 Economics and Law: Water Public Policy (Economía y Derecho: Políticas Públicas del Agua). México: Editorial Porrúa-SMGE-CIDE- FCE, 1997.
 “Answer to Rodolfo Vazquez’s Comments” (“Réplica a los comentarios de Rodolfo Vázquez”) in Isonomy: Law’s Theory and Philosophy Magazine (Isonomía: Revista de Teoría y Filosofía del Derecho), Issue 5 (October 1996), pp. 153–159.
 The Game of Negotiation (El Juego de la Negociación). México: ITAM, 1994.
 An Introduction to Economic Analysis in Law (Introducción al Análisis Económico del Derecho). México: FCE-ITAM-SMGE, 1994.

References

External links 
 Permanent Mission of Mexico to UNESCO (Spanish)
 Personal site
 Personal blog
 Roemer’s CV on National Commission of Human Rights website (Spanish)

1963 births
Living people
People from Mexico City
Mexican journalists
Male journalists
Mexican television personalities
National Autonomous University of Mexico alumni
Instituto Tecnológico Autónomo de México alumni
Harvard Kennedy School alumni
Goldman School of Public Policy alumni
Mexican diplomats
Fulbright alumni